Kwari is a first-person shooter multiplayer online game developed by Micro Forté and released by Kwari Ltd. on January 7, 2008. Kwari is free to download but requires players to spend money to buy ammunition and other in-game items. Players can earn money by killing other players and holding a certain item (called "the pill") at the end of the game. On the other hand, players lose money when being killed. 

Kwari received negative reviews on release, with reviewers criticizing the business model that appears to disadvantage almost all players as well as the game's technical aspects.

References

External links
 

First-person shooters
Multiplayer online games
2008 video games
Video games developed in Australia
Windows games
Windows-only games